Cawthra House is the name for two homes owned by the Cawthra family.

William Cawthra House
The first was a mansion completed in 1853 for businessman William Cawthra by Joseph Sheard and William Irving. It is a now site of the Scotia Plaza office tower in Toronto.

The Toronto building was one of several properties of the influential Cawthra family in Toronto, became a branch of Molsons Bank in 1885, then as Sterling Bank from 1908 and finally as home to Canada Life Assurance Company from 1926 until 1929.

Attempts to preserve the house failed and by 1949 it was demolished to make way for the Bank of Nova Scotia Building, now part of Scotia Plaza.

John Cawthra House 

The second building was built for John Cawthra (1789–1851) in 1830 as a home and retail store. It is still standing at 262 Main Street North in Newmarket, Ontario.

See also

 Canada Life Building - successor to Joseph Cawthra House as Canada Life Head office in Toronto.

References

Cawthra family
Greek Revival architecture in Canada
Historic house museums in Ontario
Houses in Toronto